Lamb fries are lamb testicles used as food. Historically they were parboiled, cut in half, and seasoned. Lamb testicles are served in a variety of cuisines, including Italian, Basque, breaded and fried in some barbecue restaurants, Chinese, Caucasian, Persian and Iranian Armenian (called donbalan), and Turkish. The dish is rarely served at restaurants in the United States, but can occasionally be found at Iranian restaurants.

Lamb fries, often served in a cream gravy, are a traditional dish in the Bluegrass region of Kentucky.

In popular culture
In the film Funny Farm, the main character, Andy Farmer (Chevy Chase), breaks a local record by eating thirty lamb fries, only to discover what they actually are and spit the thirty-first out in revulsion.

See also

 List of lamb dishes
 Rocky Mountain oysters
 Testicle (food)

References 

Offal
Testicle
Lamb dishes
Deep fried foods